Christina Petrowska Quilico  (born December 30, 1948) is a Canadian pianist. She is a professor emerita, senior scholar at York University in Toronto, Ontario, Canada. She was appointed to the Order of Canada in 2020 “For her celebrated career as a classical and contemporary pianist and for championing Canadian music.” In 2021, she was named a Fellow of the Royal Society of Canada. In 2022, she was appointed to the Order of Ontario for having “opened the ears of music lovers internationally through numerous classical and contemporary performances…. As a Professor of Musicology and Piano at York University, she has received esteemed research awards. As a benefactor, she established The Christina and Louis Quilico Award at the Ontario Arts Foundation and the Canadian Opera Company.”

Early life and education
Petrowska Quilico was born on December 30, 1948, in Ottawa, Ontario. Barely four months after turning 14, she made her performance debut at The Town Hall in New York City (May 4, 1963). She was attending the Juilliard School, where she went on to obtain her Bachelor of Music and Master's degree.

Career
After graduating from Juilliard, Petrowska Quilico went for post-graduate studies to Paris. She studied with Karlheinz Stockhausen and Gyorgy Ligeti at the Darmstädter Ferienkurse, and began teaching.  She later taught at The Royal Conservatory of Music, Carleton University and University of Ottawa before joining the faculty of music at York University in 1987. She is a leading performer of Canadian music, and has many recordings of solo repertoire as well as chamber works and concertos on the Canadian Music Centre's Centrediscs label. Her double album of the complete Glass Houses cycle by her late friend, composer Ann Southam, "remains Centrediscs’ best-selling CD of all time". As a duo with violinist Jacques Israelievitch, she recorded an album of Canadian music on Centrediscs and the Mozart violin and piano sonatas on the Fleur de Son label. In 1992, astronaut Steve MacLean brought her recording of Alexina Louie’s Star-Filled Night on his first mission to the Space Shuttle Columbia. In 2006, on board the Space Shuttle Atlantis, MacLean took the recording of her as soloist in the world premiere performance of David Mott's piano concerto Eclipse. A visual artist as well, she has created the covers for several of her Centrediscs CDs, notably Visions, which also features her paintings throughout the booklet.

In 2007, Petrowska Quilico received the Friends of Canadian Music Award from the Canadian Music Centre and Canadian League of Composers.

In 2020, she was appointed as a member of the Order of Canada. In May 2021, she was a winner of the York University Research Awards, and in September was named a Fellow of the Royal Society of Canada. The Order of Ontario was accorded her in 2022.

Personal life
Quilico was married to composer Michel-Georges Brégent until he died in 1993. She subsequently remarried, to baritone Louis Quilico, who died seven years later. In his memory, she created The Christina and Louis Quilico Award, which is administered by the Ontario Arts Foundation and held every two years under the auspices of the Canadian Opera Company.

Selected Discography

Orchestral / Concertos / Small Ensembles 
 “Tapestries” Centrediscs, CD-CMCCD 17011. (2011) Heather Schmidt: Piano Concerto No. 2 with the Kitchener-Waterloo Symphony Orchestra, Daniel Warren, conductor. Concerto nominated for Juno Award, Juno Awards of 2012#Classical Composition of the Year
 “3 Concerti” Centrediscs, CD-CMCCD 15610. (2010) Piano concerti by Violet Archer, Larysa Kuzmenko, and Alexina Louie with the CBC Vancouver Orchestra, Sir John Eliot Gardiner, conductor; the Toronto Symphony with Jukka Pekka Saraste, conductor; and the National Arts Centre Orchestra, Alex Pauk, conductor.  Kuzmenko concerto nominated for Juno Award, Juno Awards of 2011#Classical Composition of the Year
 David Mott “Eclipse” Centrediscs, CD-CMCCD 12707. (2007) Piano concerto with the World Chamber Ensemble, Mark Chambers, conductor. Also, solo piano music.
 “Mozart Sonatas and Variations for Piano and Violin Volumes 1 & 2” Fleur de Son/Naxos, FDS58034 & FDS58040. (2016, 2017) With Jacques Israelievitch, violin. American Record Guide Critic’s Choice (Vol. 2), 2018
 “Vocal Gems (live from New York)”, with Louis Quilico, baritone, Welspringe (2003). 
 “Mr. Rigoletto: My Life in Music” Analekta, FL 2 3143. (2000) Baritone Louis Quilico performs opera arias and art songs in Italian and French, some with Petrowska Quilico as pianist

Solo albums 
 "Vintage Americana" Navona Records, NV6384. (2021) Works by Lowell Liebermann, David Del Tredici, Frederic Rzewski, David Jaeger, Mario Davidovsky and Paul Huebner
 "Retro Americana" Navona Records, NV6361. (2021) Works by Henry Cowell, Frederic Rzewski, George Gershwin, Bill Westcott, Meredith Monk and Art Tatum
 “Sound Visionaries” Navona Records, NV6358. (2021) Debussy: Preludes Book 2; Messiaen: 7 of the Vingt Regards sur l’Enfant Jésus; Pierre Boulez: first and third sonatas
 Ann Southam “Soundspinning” Centrediscs, CD-CMCCD 26018. (2018) Early works
 “Global Sirens” Fleur de Son/Naxos, FDS 58046. (2018) Rare works by women composers from around the world
 “Worlds Apart” Centrediscs, CD-CMCCD 23717. (2017) 2-CD set, comprising “Classics with a Twist”: Works by John Rea (composer), Steven Gellman and Peter Paul Koprowski; and “Worlds Apart”: Works by David Jaeger, Diana MacIntosh, Micheline Coulombe Saint Marcoux, Patrick Cardy and Michel-Georges Brégent
 Ann Southam “Glass Houses Vol. 1 & 2” Centrediscs, CD-CMCCD 22215: the complete 15 Glass Houses, comprising “Glass Houses Volume 2” Centrediscs, CD-CMCCD 20114. (2014); and “Glass Houses Revisited” 9 revised Glass Houses. Centrediscs, CD-CMCCD 16511. (2011) Nominated for Juno Award, Juno Awards of 2012#Classical Composition of the Year
 Ernesto Nazareth “Tangos Brasileiros” Marquis Classics, MAR81519. (2013) Two CD set
 Constantine Caravassilis “Visions: The Complete Books of Rhapsodies and Fantasias” Centrediscs, CMCCD 18613. (2013) A two CD set, with cover and booklet art by Christina Petrowska Quilico
 Ann Southam “Pond Life” Centrediscs, CMCCD 14109. (2009) A 2 CD set
 “Canadian Composers Portraits: Ann Southam” Centrediscs, CMCCD 10505. (2005) A 3-CD set of the cycle Rivers.
 Michel-Georges Brégent “16 PORTRAITS” Centrediscs, CMCCD 10805. (2005) A 2 CD set of the Romantic Etudes

References

External links
 

1948 births
Living people
The Royal Conservatory of Music alumni
Academic staff of The Royal Conservatory of Music
Juilliard School alumni
Canadian classical pianists
Canadian women pianists
Musicians from Ottawa
21st-century classical pianists
Academic staff of York University
Women classical pianists
Members of the Order of Canada
Musicians from Toronto
21st-century women pianists